Warwick Charlton (9 March 1918, Chelsea, London – 10 December 2002) was an English journalist and public relations worker.

Life
A journalist's son, Warwick Charlton was educated at Epsom College.  He took several reporting jobs on Fleet Street before the Second World War, during which (due to his journalistic experience) he served alongside American forces in North Africa as Field Marshal Montgomery's press officer (creating a more informal and popular public image for him), wrote Eighth Army News, campaigned for better pay for frontline troops and founded other service newspapers (all with relative freedom from censorship thanks to Montgomery's protection).

Postwar, he is best known as the English mover behind Project Mayflower and the construction of Mayflower II, as a commemoration of the wartime cooperation between the United Kingdom and the United States.  He spent his retirement at Avon Castle, near Ringwood, and acted as Ringwood's town crier.  His obituary in The Telegraph stated he was:

Works
Lovely Day Tomorrow, play
Stately Homes Of England, play
books on the Profumo affair, Mayflower II, and casino management

References

1918 births
2002 deaths
English male journalists
People educated at Epsom College
British Army personnel of World War II
Town criers
Royal Fusiliers officers